is a railway station in the city of Nasukarasuyama, Tochigi, Japan, operated by East Japan Railway Company (JR East).

Lines

Station layout
The station has one side platform serving the single-track line. There is no station building, but only a weather shelter built into the platform. The station is unattended.

History
The station opened on 15 August 1934.

Surrounding area
Minami-Utsunomiya Country Club
Nisshin Kogyo

See also
 List of railway stations in Japan

References

External links

 JR East Station information 

Railway stations in Tochigi Prefecture
Railway stations in Japan opened in 1934
Karasuyama Line
Nasukarasuyama
Stations of East Japan Railway Company